Talk That Talk is an album by jazz organist Johnny "Hammond" Smith recorded for the New Jazz label in 1960.

Reception

AllMusic awarded the album 4 stars stating "Smith's playing on this album is low-key almost to the point of being conservative, deeply soulful without resorting to what would soon become tired funk clichés".

Track listing
All compositions by Johnny "Hammond" Smith except where noted.
 "Talk That Talk" – 5:12
 "An Affair to Remember" – 2:35
 "The End of a Love Affair" (Edward Redding) – 5:22
 "Minors Allowed" – 5:47
 "Rip Tide" (Walter Donaldson, Gus Kahn) – 4:48
 "Misty" (Johnny Burke, Erroll Garner) – 4:01
 "Bennie's Diggin'" – 4:59
 "A Portrait of Jennie" (Russell Robinson, Gordon Burdge) – 2:23
Recorded at Van Gelder Studio in Englewood Cliffs, New Jersey on April 22, 1960

Personnel
Johnny "Hammond" Smith – organ
Oliver Nelson – tenor saxophone (tracks 4, 5 & 7)
George Tucker – bass
Art Taylor – drums
Ray Barretto – congas
 Esmond Edwards – producer
 Rudy Van Gelder – engineer

References

Johnny "Hammond" Smith albums
1960 albums
New Jazz Records albums
Albums produced by Esmond Edwards
Albums recorded at Van Gelder Studio